Heinrich Krippel (27 September 1883 – 5 April 1945) was an Austrian sculptor, painter, chalcographer and illustrator. He is best known for his creation of monumental statues of Mustafa Kemal Atatürk in Turkey.

He was educated at Academy of Fine Arts Vienna between 1904 and 1909.

Notable works
Atatürk Monument, Seraglio Point (Sarayburnu Atatürk Anıtı) (3 October 1926)
Atatürk Monument, Konya (29 October 1926)
Victory Monument, Ankara (Ankara Zafer Anıtı) (24 November 1927))
Statue of Honor, Samsun (Onur Anıtı, Samsun) (15 January 1932)
Monument of Great Triumph, Afyonkarahisar (Büyük Utku Anıtı) (24 March 1936)
Monument of Sitting Atatürk, Ankara (Oturan Atatürk Anıtı) (1938)

References

1883 births
Artists from Vienna
Academy of Fine Arts Vienna alumni
Austrian sculptors
Austrian male sculptors
20th-century Austrian painters
20th-century male artists
Austrian male painters
Austrian engravers
Austrian illustrators
Austrian expatriates in Turkey
Monuments and memorials to Mustafa Kemal Atatürk
1945 deaths
20th-century sculptors